Karaweik or Karaweik Hall is a palace on the eastern shore of Kandawgyi Lake, Yangon, Burma.

Etymology
The word karaweik comes from Pali karavika, which is a mythical bird with a melodious cry.

Design
The barge was designed by Burmese architect U Ngwe Hlaing, who based it on the Pyigyimon royal barge.

Construction
Construction began in June 1972 and it was finished in October 1974.

Structure
The barge is a two-storied construction of concrete and stucco, reinforced by iron rods, with a pyatthat-topped roof, two reception halls and a conference room. It houses a buffet restaurant today.

References

Yangon
Burmese culture
Restaurants in Yangon
Palaces in Myanmar
Buildings and structures completed in 1974